This is a list of people elected Fellow of the Royal Society in 1934.

Fellows 

Abram Samoilovitch Besicovitch
William Edward Curtis
Sir Lewis Leigh Fermor
Sir Paul Gordon Fildes
Ronald Thomson Grant
Martin Alister Campbell Hinton
Sir Edmund Langley Hirst
Sir Ernest Laurence Kennaway
Anthony George Maldon Michell
William Arthur Parks
Harold Raistrick
Alexander Oliver Rankine
Robert Beresford Seymour Sewell
Samuel Sugden
William Taylor
Hugh Hamshaw Thomas
Alfred Young

Foreign members
Henri Leon Lebesgue
Otto Heinrich Warburg

Statute 12 Fellow
Edgar Vincent, Viscount D'Abernon

1934
1934 in science
1934 in the United Kingdom